Charmante was a 32-gun of the French Navy, lead ship of her class.

Career 
In 1778, under Lieutenant Henri Pantaléon de Mac Nemara, Charmante cruised in the Caribbean, arriving at Fort Royal on 23 June 1778.

On 1 September, as Charmante was escorting a convoy from Port-au-Prince around Saint-Domingue along with Dédaigneuse, she encountered the British frigate HMS Active, under Captain Williams-Freeman, and captured her.

On 16 February 1780, under Baron de la Haye, she was part of a squadron comprising the 64-gun Ajax and Protée, as well as the fluyt Éléphant. In the action of 24 February 1780, the convoy encountered a British force under George Rodney, and Protée sacrificed herself to cover the retreat of her fellows. While the convoy sailed on to the Indian Ocean with Ajax, Charmante returned to Lorient to bring the news of the battle, arriving there on 3 March.

Fate
Charmante was wrecked on 24 March 1780 when a gale pushed her on the Chaussée de Sein. 83 men, including Captain Mengaud de la Haye, managed to escape on the ship's longboat, while 210 men died.

Notes, citations, and references 

Notes

Citations

References
 
 
 
 

Age of Sail frigates of France
Ships built in France
1777 ships
Charmante-class frigates
Maritime incidents in 1780
Shipwrecks in the Caribbean Sea